Fort Vinton, also known as "Post #2", was a small Florida military outpost that existed from 1839 to 1858. Location of the fort is approximately a mile south of highway 60 near 122nd Avenue.

History
The fort existed mostly to help quell the periodic problems with the Seminole Amerindians and was abandoned in 1850 after the final battle with that tribe. It was reopened for the third Seminole War from 1856 to 1858. For most of its existence it was simply known as "Post #2" but was renamed in honor of Major John Rogers Vinton (1801–1847), grandfather of Francis L. V. Hoppin, just before it was closed in May 1850.

In the 19th century, the fort's location would have been on the edge of a humid mosquito-infested cypress swamp, days away from any trace of civilization. Today the area is planted in oranges and grapefruit, though it's still humid and mosquito-infested.

References 
Rootsweb Entry
Heritage Foundation Information

External links 
Fort Vinton historical marker
News article on Fort Vinton historical marker moving in 2010
Text mentioning the order to build forts and how far apart
Discussion of marker movement and fort conservation
1882 map of Brevard County including forts
News article on finding the fort

Military installations in Florida
Indian River County, Florida